American Indian boarding schools, also known more recently as American Indian residential schools, were established in the United States from the mid-17th to the early 20th centuries with a primary objective of "civilizing" or assimilating Native American children and youth into European American culture. In the process, these schools denigrated Native American culture and made children give up their languages and religion. At the same time the schools provided a basic Western education. These boarding schools were first established by Christian missionaries of various denominations. The missionaries were often approved by the federal government to start both missions and schools on reservations, especially in the lightly populated areas of the West. In the late 19th and early 20th centuries especially, the government paid religious orders to provide basic education to Native American children on reservations, and later established its own schools on reservations. The Bureau of Indian Affairs (BIA) also founded additional off-reservation boarding schools based on the assimilation model. These sometimes drew children from a variety of tribes. In addition, religious orders established off-reservation schools.

Children were typically immersed in European American culture. Schools forced removal of indigenous cultural signifiers: cutting the children's hair, having them wear American-style uniforms, forbidding them from speaking their mother tongues, and replacing their tribal names with English language names (saints names under some religious orders) for use at the schools, as part of assimilation and to Christianize them. The schools were usually harsh, especially for younger children who had been forcibly separated from their families and forced to abandon their Native American identities and cultures. Children sometimes died in the school system due to infectious disease. Investigations of the later 20th century revealed cases of physical, emotional, and sexual abuse occurring mostly in church-run schools.

Summarizing recent scholarship from Native perspectives, Dr. Julie Davis said:

Since those years, tribal nations have carried out political activism and gained legislation and federal policy that gives them the power to decide how to use federal education funds, how they educate their children, and the authority to establish their own community-based schools. Tribes have also founded numerous tribal colleges and universities on reservations. Tribal control over their schools has been supported by federal legislation and changing practices by the BIA. By 2007, most of the boarding schools had been closed down, and the number of Native American children in boarding schools had declined to 9,500.

Although there are hundreds of deceased Indigenous children yet to be found, investigations are increasing across the United States.

History of education of Native Americans by Europeans

In the late eighteenth century, reformers starting with President George Washington and Henry Knox, in efforts to "civilize" or otherwise assimilate Native Americans, adopted the practice of assimilating Native American children in current American culture. At the time the society was dominated by agriculture, with many yeomen subsistence farmers, and rural society made up of some small towns and few large cities. The Civilization Fund Act of 1819 promoted this policy by providing funding to societies (mostly religious missionaries) who worked on Native American education, often at schools established in or near Native American communities. The reformers believed this policy would help the Indians survive increasing contact with European-American settlers who were moving west into their territories.

Moses Tom sent his children to an Indian boarding school.

Early mission schools
In 1634, Fr. Andrew White of the English Province of the Society of Jesus established a mission in what is now Southern Maryland. He said the purpose of the mission, as an interpreter told the chief of a Native American tribe there, was "to extend civilization and instruction to his ignorant race, and show them the way to heaven." The mission's annual records report that by 1640, they had founded a community they named St. Mary's. Native Americans were sending their children there to be educated, including the daughter of Tayac, the Pascatoe chief. She was likely an exception because of her father's status, as girls were generally not educated with boys in English Catholic schools of the period. Other students discussed in the records were male.

The same records report that in 1677, 

In the mid-1600s, Harvard College had an "Indian College" on its campus in Cambridge, Massachusetts Bay Colony, supported by the Anglican Society for Propagation of the Gospel. Its few Native American students came from New England. In this period higher education was very limited for all classes, and most 'colleges' taught at a level more similar to today's high schools. In 1665, Caleb Cheeshahteaumuck, "from the Wampanoag...did graduate from Harvard, the first Indian to do so in the colonial period".

In the early colonial years, other Indian schools were created by local New England communities, as with the Indian school in Hanover, New Hampshire, in 1769. This gradually developed as Dartmouth College, which has retained some programs for Native Americans. Other schools were also created in the East, such as in Bethlehem, Pennsylvania by Moravian missionaries. Religious missionaries from various denominations developed the first schools as part of their missions near indigenous settlements, believing they could extend education and Christianity to Native Americans. East of the Appalachian Mountains, most Indians had been forced off their traditional lands before the American Revolutionary War. They had few reservations.

In the early nineteenth century, the new republic continued to deal with questions about how Native American peoples would live. The Foreign Mission School, a Protestant-backed institution that opened in Cornwall, Connecticut in 1816, was set up for male students from a variety of non-Christian peoples, mostly abroad. Native Hawaiians, Muslim and Hindu students from India and Southeast Asia were among the nearly 100 total who attended during its decade of operation. Also enrolled were Native American students from the Cherokee and Choctaw tribes (among the Five Civilized Tribes of the American Southeast), as well as Lenape (a mid-Atlantic tribe) and Osage students. It was intended to train young people as missionaries, interpreters, translators, etc. who could help guide their peoples.

Nationhood, Indian Wars, and western settlement
Through the 19th century, the encroachment of European Americans on Indian lands continued. From the 1830s, tribes from both the Southeast and the Great Lakes areas were pushed west of the Mississippi, forced off their lands to Indian Territory. As part of the treaties signed for land cessions, the United States was supposed to provide education to the tribes on their reservations. Some religious orders and organizations established missions in Kansas and what later became Oklahoma to work on these new reservations. Some of the Southeast tribes established their own schools, as the Choctaw did for both girls and boys.

After the Civil War and decades of Indian Wars in the West, more tribes were forced onto reservations after ceding vast amounts of land to the US. With the goal of assimilation, believed necessary so that tribal Indians could survive to become part of American society, the government increased its efforts to provide education opportunities. Some of this was related to the progressive movement, which believed the only way for the tribal peoples to make their way was to become assimilated, as American society was rapidly changing and urbanizing.

Following the Indian Wars, missionaries founded additional schools in the West with boarding facilities. Given the vast areas and isolated populations, they could support only a limited number of schools. Some children necessarily had to attend schools that were distant from their communities. Initially under President Ulysses S. Grant, only one religious organization or order was permitted on any single reservation. The various denominations lobbied the government to be permitted to set up missions, even in competition with each other.

Assimilation-era day schools

Day schools were also created to implement federal mandates.  Compared to boarding schools, day schools were a less expensive option that usually received less parental pushback.

One example is the Fallon Indian Day School opened on the Stillwater Indian Reservation in 1908. Even after the process of closing boarding schools started, day schools remained open.

Carlisle Indian Industrial School 

After the Indian Wars, Lieutenant Richard Henry Pratt was assigned to supervise Native prisoners of war at Fort Marion which was located in St. Augustine, Florida. The United States Army sent seventy-two warriors from the Cheyenne, Kiowa, Comanche and Caddo nations, to exile in St. Augustine, Florida. They were used as hostages to encourage their peoples in the West to remain peaceful.

Pratt began to work with them on education in European-American culture, essentially a kind of immersion. While he required changes: the men had to cut their hair and wear common uniforms rather than their traditional clothes, he also granted them increased autonomy and the ability to govern themselves within the prison. Pleased by his success, he was said to have supported the motto, "Kill the Indian, Save the Man." Pratt said in a speech in 1892:

Pratt provided for some of the younger men to pursue more education at the Hampton Institute, a historically black college founded in 1868 for the education of freedmen by biracial representatives of the American Missionary Association soon after the Civil War. Following Pratt's sponsored students, Hampton in 1875 developed a program for Native American students.

Pratt continued the assimilation model in developing the Carlisle Indian Industrial School. Pratt felt that within one generation Native children could be integrated into Euro-American culture. With this perspective he proposed an expensive experiment to the federal government. Pratt wanted the government to fund a school that would require Native children to move away from their homes to attend a school far away. The Carlisle Indian school, which became the template for over 300 schools across the United States, opened in 1879. Carlisle Barracks an abandoned Pennsylvanian military base was used for the school. It became the first school that was not on a reservation.

The Carlisle curriculum was heavy based on the culture and society of rural America. The classes included vocational training for boys and domestic science for girls. Students worked to carry out chores that helped sustain the farm and food production for the self-supporting school. They were also able to produce goods to sell at the market. Carlisle students produced a newspaper, had a well-regarded chorus and orchestra, and developed sports programs. In the summer students often lived with local farm families and townspeople, reinforcing their assimilation, and providing labor at low cost to the families..

Federally supported boarding schools
Carlisle and its curriculum became the model for the Bureau of Indian Affairs. By 1902 it authorized 25 federally funded off-reservation schools in 15 states and territories, with a total enrollment of over 6,000 students. Federal legislation required Native American children to be educated according to Anglo-American standards. Parents had to authorize their children's attendance at boarding schools and, if they refused, officials could use coercion to gain a quota of students from any given reservation.

Boarding schools were also established on reservations, where they were often operated by religious missions or institutes, which were generally independent of the local diocese, in the case of Catholic orders. Because of the distances, often Native American children were separated from their families and tribes when they attended such schools on other reservations. At the peak of the federal program, the BIA supported 350 boarding schools.

In the late 19th and early 20th centuries, when students arrived at boarding schools, their lives altered dramatically. They were given short haircuts (a source of shame for boys of many tribes, who considered long hair part of their maturing identity), required to wear uniforms, and to take English names for use at the school. Sometimes the names were based on their own; other times they were assigned at random. The children were not allowed to speak their own languages, even between each other. They were required to attend church services and were often baptized as Christians. As was typical of the time, discipline was stiff in many schools. It often included assignment of extra chores for punishment, solitary confinement and corporal punishment, including beatings by teachers using sticks, rulers and belts.

Anna Moore said, regarding the Phoenix Indian School:

Abuse in the boarding schools
The children who were admitted into boarding schools experienced several forms of abuse. They were given white names, forced to speak English, and were not allowed to practice their culture. They took classes on how to conduct manual labor such as farming and housekeeping. When they were not in class, they were expected to maintain the upkeep of the schools. Unclean and overpopulated living conditions led to the spread of disease and many students did not receive enough food. Bounties were offered for students who tried to run away and many students committed suicide. Students who died were sometimes placed in coffins and buried in the school cemetery by their own classmates.

Indigenous children were forcibly removed from their families and admitted to these boarding schools. Their cultural traditions were discarded when they were taught about American ideas of refinement and civilization. This forced assimilation increased substance abuse and suicides among these students as they suffered mental illnesses such as depression and PTSD. These illnesses also increased the risk of developing cardiovascular diseases.

The sexual abuse of indigenous children in boarding schools was perpetrated by the administrators of these programs. Teachers, nuns, and priests performed these acts upon their students. Children were touched and molested to be used as pleasure by these mentors who were supposed to educate them. Several mentors considered these students as objects and sexually abused them by forming rotations to switch in and out whenever they were done sexually tormenting the next student. These adults also used sexual abuse as a form of embarrassment towards each other. In tracing the path of violence, several students experienced an assault that, "can only be described as unconscionable, it was a violation not only of a child's body but an assault on their spirit". This act created a majority among the children who were victims in silence. This recurred in boarding schools across the nation in different scenarios. These include boys being sexually assaulted on their 13th birthdays to girls being forcibly taken at night by the priest to be used as objects.

As claimed by Dr. Jon Reyhner, he described methods of discipline by mentioning that: "The boys were laid on an empty barrel and whipped with a long leather strap". Methods such as these have left physical injuries and made the institutions dangerous for these children as they lived in fear of violence. Many children did not recover from their wounds caused by abuse from as they were often left untreated.

Legality and policy

In 1776, the Continental Congress authorized the Indian commissioners to engage ministers as teachers to work with Indians. This movement increased after the War of 1812.

In 1819, Congress appropriated $10,000 to hire teachers and maintain schools. These resources were allocated to the missionary church schools because the government had no other mechanism to educate the Indian population.

In 1887, to provide funding for more boarding schools, Congress passed the Compulsory Indian Education Act

In 1891, a compulsory attendance law enabled federal officers to forcibly take Native American children from their homes and reservations. The American government believed they were rescuing these children from a world of poverty and depression and teaching them "life skills".

Tabatha Toney Booth of the University of Central Oklahoma wrote in her paper, Cheaper Than Bullets,

Between 1778 and 1871, the federal government signed 389 treaties with American Indian tribes. Most of these treaties contained provisions that  the  federal government would provide education and other services in exchange for land. The last of these treaties, the Fort Laramie Treaty of 1868, established the Great Sioux Reservation. One particular article in the Fort Laramie Treaty illustrates the attention the federal government paid to the  "civilizing" nature of education: "Article 7. In order to insure the civilization of the Indians entering int this treaty the necessity of education is admitted, especially of such of them as are or may be settled on said agricultural reservations, and they therefore pledge themselves to compel their children, male and female, between the ages of six and sixteen years to attend school"

Use of the English language in the education of American Indian children was first mentioned in the report of the Indian Peace Commission, a body appointed by an act of Congress in 1867. The report stated that the difference of languages was a major problem and advocated elimination of Indian languages and replacement of them with English. This report created a controversy in Indian education  because the missionaries who had been responsible for educating Native youth used a bilingual instructional policy. In 1870, President Grant criticized this beginning a new policy with eradication of Native languages as a major goal

In 1871, the United States government prohibited further treaties with Indian nations and also passed the Appropriations Act for Indian Education requiring the establishment of day schools on reservations.

In 1873, the Board of Indian Commissions argued in a Report to Congress that days schools were ineffective at teach Indian children English because they spent 20 hours per day at home speaking their native language. The Senate and House Indian Affairs committees joined in the criticism of day schools a year later arguing that they operated too much to perpetuate "the Indian as special-status individual rather than preparing for him independent citizenship"

"The boarding school movement began after the Civil War, when reformers turned their attention to the plight of Indian people and advocated for proper education and treatment so that Indians could become like other citizens. One of the first efforts to accomplish this goal was the establishment of the Carlisle Indian School in Pennsylvania, founded in 1879." The leader of the school, General Pratt also employed the "outing system" which placed Indians in non-Indian homes during the summers and for three years following high school to learn non-Indian culture (ibid).   Government subsidies were made to participating families. Pratt believed  that this was both educating American Indians and making them Americans. In 1900, 1,880 Carlisle students participated in this system, each with his or her own bank account.

In the late 1800s, the federal government pursued a policy of total assimilation of the American Indian into mainstream American society.

In 1918, Carlisle boarding school was closed because Pratt's method of assimilating American Indian students through off-reservation boarding schools was perceived as outdated. That same year Congress passed new Indian education legislation, the Act of May 25, 1918. It generally forbade expenditures for separate education of children less than 1/4 Indian whose parents are citizens of the United States when they live in an area where adequate free public schools are provided.

Meriam Report of 1928

In 1926, the Department of the Interior (DOI) commissioned the Brookings Institution to conduct a survey of the overall conditions of American Indians and to assess federal programs and policies. The Meriam Report, officially titled The Problem of Indian Administration, was submitted February 21, 1928, to Secretary of the Interior Hubert Work. Related to education of Native American children, it recommended that the government:
 Abolish The Uniform Course of Study, which taught only European-American cultural values;
 Educate younger children at community schools near home, and have older children attend non-reservation schools for higher grade work;
 Have the Indian Service (now Bureau of Indian Affairs) provide American Indians the education and skills they need to adapt both in their own communities and United States society.

The  Indian  Reorganization  Act  of  1934 
The Indian  Reorganization Act of 1934 ended the allotment period of history, confirmed the rights to Indian self-government, and made Indians eligible to hold Bureau of Indian Affairs posts, which encouraged Indians to attend vocational schools and colleges." During this period there was an effort to encourage the development of community day schools; however, public school attendance for Indian children was also  encouraged. In the same year, the Johnson–O'Malley Act (JOM) was passed, which provided for the reimbursement of states for the cost of educating  Indian students in public schools. This federal-state contract provided that a specified sum be paid by the federal government and held the state responsible for the education and welfare of Indians within its boundaries. Funds made available from the O'Malley act were designated to assist in reducing the enrollment of Indian boarding schools, placing them in public schools instead.

The termination period
In 1953, Congress passed House Concurrent Resolution 108, which set a new direction in federal policy toward Indians. The major spokesperson for the resolution Senator Arthur Watkins (Utah), stated: "As rapidly as possible, we should end the status of Indians as wards of the government and grant them all the rights and prerogatives pertaining to American citizenship" The federal government implemented another new policy, aimed at relocating Indian people to urban cities and away from the reservations, terminating the tribes as separate entities. There were sixty-one tribes terminated during that period.

1968 onward

In 1968, President Lyndon B. Johnson ended this practice and the termination period. He also directed the Secretary of the Interior to establish Indian School boards for federal Indian schools to be comprised by members of the communities.

Major legislation aimed at improving Indian education occurred in the 1970s. In 1972, Congress passed the Indian Education Act, which established a comprehensive approach to meeting the unique needs of American Indians and Alaska Native students. This Act recognizes that American Indians have unique educational and culturally related academic needs and distinct language and cultural needs. The most far-reaching legislation to be signed during the 1970s, however, was the Indian Self-Determination and Education Assistance Act of 1975, which guaranteed tribes the opportunity to determine their own futures and the education of their children through funds allocated to and administrated by individual tribes.

Disease and death 
Given the lack of public sanitation and the often crowded conditions at boarding schools in the early 20th-century, students were at risk for infectious diseases such as tuberculosis, measles, and trachoma. None of these diseases was yet treatable by antibiotics or controlled by vaccines, and epidemics swept schools as they did cities.

The overcrowding of the schools contributed to the rapid spread of disease within the schools. "An often-underpaid staff provided irregular medical care. And not least, apathetic boarding school officials frequently failed to heed their own directions calling for the segregation of children in poor health from the rest of the student body". Tuberculosis was especially deadly among students. Many children died while in custody at Indian schools. Often students were prevented from communicating with their families, and parents were not notified when their children fell ill; the schools also failed sometimes to notify them when a child died. "Many of the Indian deaths during the great influenza pandemic of 1918–1919, which hit the Native American population hard, took place in boarding schools."

The 1928 Meriam Report noted that infectious disease was often widespread at the schools due to malnutrition, overcrowding, poor sanitary conditions, and students weakened by overwork. The report said that death rates for Native American students were six and a half times higher than for other ethnic groups. A report regarding the Phoenix Indian School said, "In December of 1899, measles broke out at the Phoenix Indian School, reaching epidemic proportions by January. In its wake, 325 cases of measles, 60 cases of pneumonia, and 9 deaths were recorded in a 10-day period.""

Implications of assimilation 

From 1810 to 1917, the U.S. federal government subsidized mission and boarding schools. By 1885, 106 Indian schools had been established, many of them on abandoned military installations. Using military personnel and Indian prisoners, boarding schools were seen as a means for the government to achieve assimilation of Native Americans into mainstream American culture. Assimilation efforts included forcibly removing Native Americans from their families, converting them to Christianity, preventing them from learning or practicing indigenous culture and customs, and living in a strict military fashion.

When students arrived at boarding schools, the routine was typically the same. First, the students were forced to give up their tribal clothing and their hair was cut. Second, "[t]o instill the necessary discipline, the entire school routine was organized in martial fashion, and every facet of student life followed a strict timetable".

One student recalled the routine in the 1890s:
A small bell was tapped, and each of the pupils drew a chair from under the table. Supposing this act meant that they were to be seated, I pulled out mine and at once slipped into it from one side. But when I turned my head, I saw that I was the only one seated, and all the rest at our table remained standing. Just as I began to rise, looking shyly around to see how chairs were to be used, a second bell was sounded. All were seated at last, and I had to crawl back into my chair again. I heard a man's voice at one end of the hall, and I looked around to see him. But all the others hung their heads over their plates. As I glanced at the long chain of tables, I cause the eyes of a paleface woman upon me. Immediately I dropped my eyes, wondering why I was so keenly watched by the strange woman. The man ceased his mutterings, and then a third bell was tapped. Everyone picked up his knife and fork and began eating. I began crying instead, for by this time I was afraid to venture anything more.

Besides mealtime routines, administrators "educated" Indigenous students on how to farm using European-based methods, which they considered superior to indigenous methods. Given the constraints of rural locations and limited budgets, boarding schools often operated supporting farms, raising livestock and produced their vegetables and fruit.

From the moment students arrived at school, they could not "be Indian" in any way. Boarding school administrators "forbade, whether in school or on reservation, tribal singing and dancing, along with the wearing of ceremonial and 'savage' clothes, the practice of native religions, the speaking of tribal languages, the acting out of traditional gender roles". School administrators argued that young women needed to be specifically targeted due to their important place in continuing assimilation education in their future homes. Educational administrators and teachers were instructed that "Indian girls were to be assured that, because their grandmothers did things in a certain way, there was no reason for them to do the same".

Removal to reservations in the West in the early part of the century and the enactment of the Dawes Act in 1887 eventually took nearly 50 million acres of land from Indian control. On-reservation schools were either taken over by Anglo leadership or destroyed. Indian-controlled school systems became non-existent while "the Indians [were] made captives of federal or mission education".

Although schools did use verbal correction to enforce assimilation, more violent measures were also used, as corporal punishment was common in European American society. Archuleta et al. (2000) noted cases where students had "their mouths washed out with lye soap when they spoke their native languages; they could be locked up in the guardhouse with only bread and water for other rule violations; and they faced corporal punishment and other rigid discipline on a daily basis". Beyond physical and mental abuse, some school authorities sexually abused students as well.

One former student recounted,

Intimidation and fear were very much present in our daily lives. For instance, we would cower from the abusive disciplinary practices of some superiors, such as the one who yanked my cousin's ear hard enough to tear it. After a nine-year-old girl was raped in her dormitory bed during the night, we girls would be so scared that we would jump into each other's bed as soon as the lights went out. The sustained terror in our hearts further tested our endurance, as it was better to suffer with a full bladder and be safe than to walk through the dark, seemingly endless hallway to the bathroom.  When we were older, we girls anguished each time we entered the classroom of a certain male teacher who stalked and molested girls.

Girls and young women taken from their families and placed into boarding schools, such as the Hampton Normal and Agricultural Institute, were urged to accomplish the U.S. federal government's vision of "educating Indian girls in the hope that women trained as good housewives would help their mates assimilate" into U.S. mainstream culture.

Historian Brenda Child asserts that boarding schools cultivated pan-Indian-ism and made possible cross-tribal coalitions that helped many different tribes collaborate in the later 20th century. She argues:

People formerly separated by language, culture, and geography lived and worked together in residential schools. Students formed close bonds and enjoyed a rich cross-cultural change. Graduates of government schools often married former classmates, found employment in the Indian Service, migrated to urban areas, returned to their reservations and entered tribal politics. Countless new alliances, both personal and political, were forged in government boarding schools.

Jacqueline Emery, introducing an anthology of boarding school writings, suggests that these writings prove that the children showed a cultural and personal resilience "more common among boarding school students than one might think". Although school authorities censored the material, it demonstrates multiple methods of resistance to school regimes. Several students educated in boarding schools, such as Gertrude Bonnin, Angel De Cora, Francis La Flesche, and Laura Cornelius Kellogg, became highly educated and were precursors to modern Indigenous activists.

After release or graduation from Indian boarding schools, students were expected to return to their tribes and induce European assimilation there. Many students who returned to their reservations experienced alienation, language and cultural barriers, and confusion, in addition to posttraumatic stress disorder and the legacy of trauma from abuse. They struggled to respect elders, but also met resistance from family and friends when trying to initiate Anglo-American changes. 

Everyone in these boarding schools faced hardship but that did not stop them from building their foundation of resistance. Native students utilized what was taught at school to speak up and perform activism. They were very intelligent and resourceful to become knowledgeable in activist and political works. Forcibly being removed from their families, many put up a stance to refuse their kids to be kidnapped from them by hiding them and encouraging them to run away. It has not always been successful but it was a form of resistance that was present during this period.

As mentioned by historians Brian Klopotek and Brenda Child, "A remote Indian population living in Northern Minnesota who, in 1900, took a radical position against the construction of a government school." This Indigenous population is rather known as the Ojibwe people showed hostility to construction happening on their land by expressing armed resistance. The Ojibwe men stood as armed guards surrounding the construction workers and their building indicating the workmen were not welcomed to build on their region of living. This type of armed resistance was common throughout Native society during the boarding school period. Many indigenous communities expressed this rebellion throughout their stolen land.

A famous resistance tactic used by these students in boarding schools was speaking and responding back in their mother tongue. These schools stressed the importance of enforcing the extinction of their first language and adapting to English. Speaking their language symbolized a bond that strictly attached them closer still to their culture. Speaking their mother tongue resulted in physical abuse which was feared but resistance continued in this form to cause frustration. They wanted to show that their roots are deeply rooted in them and cannot be replaced with force. Another form of resistance they used was misbehavior, giving their staff a very hard time. This meant acting very foolish making it hard for them to be handled. Misbehaving meant consistently breaking the rules, acting out of character, and starting fires or fights. This was all an act and a habit to be kicked out of the boarding school and in hopes to be sent home. They wanted to be a huge headache enough to not suffer abuse but to be expelled. Resistance was a form of courage used to go against these boarding schools. These efforts were inspired by each other and from times of colonization. It was a way to keep their mother tongue, culture, and Native identities still attached and restored to civilization. Using resistance tactics helped slow down the intelligence of American culture being understood and taught.

The ongoing effects this event had brought within indigenous communities was hardly forgivable by these various groups. "According to Mary Annette Pember, whose mother was forced to attend St. Mary's Catholic Boarding school in Wisconsin, her mother often recollected, "the beatings, the shaming, and the withholding of food (P.15)." done by the nuns. Thus her mothers lasting effects, the traumatic effects that boarding schools have had continue for generations of Native people who never attended the schools such as families members with surviving and missing loved ones.

When faculty visited former students, they rated their success based on the following criteria: "orderly households, 'citizen's dress', Christian weddings, 'well-kept' babies, land in severalty, children in school, industrious work habits, and leadership roles in promoting the same 'civilized' lifestyles among family and tribe". many students returned to the boarding schools. General Richard Henry Pratt, an administrator who had founded the Carlisle Indian Industrial School, began to believe that "[t]o civilize the Indian, get him into civilization. To keep him civilized, let him stay."

Schools in mid-20th century and later changes
Attendance in Indian boarding schools generally increased throughout the first half of the 20th century, doubling by the 1960s. 
In 1969, the BIA operated 226 schools in 17 states, including on reservations and in remote geographical areas. Some 77 were boarding schools. A total of 34,605 children were enrolled in the boarding schools; 15,450 in BIA day schools; and 3854 were housed in dormitories "while attending public schools with BIA financial support. In addition, 62,676 Indian youngsters attend public schools supported by the Johnson-O'Malley Act, which is administered by BIA."

Enrollment reached its highest point in the 1970s. In 1973, 60,000 American Indian children are estimated to have been enrolled in an Indian boarding school. 

The rise of pan-Indian activism, tribal nations' continuing complaints about the schools, and studies in the late 1960s and mid-1970s (such as the Kennedy Report of 1969 and the National Study of American Indian Education) led to passage of the Indian Self-Determination and Education Assistance Act of 1975.  This emphasized authorizing tribes to contract with federal agencies in order to take over management of programs such as education. It also enabled the tribes to establish community schools for their children on their reservations.

In 1978, Congress passed and the President signed the Indian Child Welfare Act, giving Native American parents the legal right to refuse their child's placement in a school. Damning evidence related to years of abuses of students in off-reservation boarding schools contributed to the enactment of the Indian Child Welfare Act. Congress approved this act after hearing testimony about life in Indian boarding schools.

As a result of these changes, many large Indian boarding schools closed in the 1980s and early 1990s. Some located on reservations were taken over by tribes. By 2007, the number of American Indian children living in Indian boarding school dormitories had declined to 9,500. This figure includes those in 45 on-reservation boarding schools, seven off-reservation boarding schools, and 14 peripheral dormitories. From 1879 to the present day, it is estimated that hundreds of thousands of Native Americans attended Indian boarding schools as children.

In the early 21st century, about two dozen off-reservation boarding schools still operate, but funding for them has declined.

Native American tribes developed one of the first women's colleges.

21st century 

Circa 2020, the Bureau of Indian Education operates approximately 183 schools, primarily non-boarding, and primarily located on reservations. The schools have 46,000 students. Modern criticisms focus on the quality of education provided and compliance with federal education standards. In March 2020 the BIA finalized a rule to create Standards, Assessments and Accountability System (SAAS) for all BIA schools. The motivation behind the rule is to prepare BIA students to be ready for college and careers.

Books about Native American boarding schools
 Education for Extinction: American Indians and the Boarding School Experience, 1875–1928, author David Wallace Adams (1995)
 Indian Horse, author Richard Wagamese (Ojibwe) (2012)

Movies and documentaries about Native American boarding schools
 Our Spirits Don't Speak English: Indian Boarding School, Documentary produced by Rich-Heape Films (2008)
 The Only Good Indian, 2009 film starring Wes Studi
 Playing for the World, Documentary produced by Montana PBS (2010)
 Our Fires Still Burn, Documentary produced by Audrey Geyer (2013)
 Unspoken: America's Native American Boarding Schools, Documentary produced by KUED (2016)
 Indian Horse, based on the book with the same name written by Richard Wagamese (Ojibwe), produced by Devonshire Productions and Screen Siren Pictures (2017)

List of Native American boarding schools

Listed of Native American boarding schools by present-day state or territory, and in alphabetical order.

Alabama 

 Asbury Manual Labor School, near Fort Mitchell, Alabama, open 1822–30 run by the United Methodist Missions.

Alaska 

 Jesse Lee Home for Children, Originally in Unalaska, Alaska, moved to Seward, Alaska and later Anchorage, Alaska.  Founded and run by Methodist Church
 Mount Edgecumbe High School, Sitka, Alaska, established as a BIA school, now operated by the State of Alaska
 Sheldon Jackson College, Presbyterian-run high school, then college, in Sitka, Alaska
 Wrangell Institute, Presbyterian church-led initiative, run by the BIA in Wrangell, Alaska

Arizona 

 Chinle Boarding School, at Chinle, Arizona (1910-1976); then relocated to Many Farms, Arizona; converted to Navajo operated school that year
 Holbrook Indian School, Holbrook, Arizona
 Many Farms High School, near Many Farms, Arizona
 Phoenix Indian School, Phoenix, Arizona
 Pinon Boarding School, Pinon, Arizona
 Theodore Roosevelt Indian Boarding School, founded in 1923 in buildings of the U.S. Army's closed Fort Apache, Arizona, as of 2016 operating as a Navajo tribal school

 Truxton Boarding School near the Haulapai Reservation, a national historic site.

California 

 Fort Bidwell School, Fort Bidwell, California
 Greenville School, California
 St. Boniface Indian School, Banning, California
 Sherman Indian High School, in Riverside, California since 1903

Colorado 
 Ignacio Boarding School, Colorado
 Teller Institute, Grand Junction Colorado

Connecticut 

 Eleazar Wheelock and Moor's Indian Charity School, Lebanon, Connecticut open from 1754 to 1768

Idaho 
 Mary Immaculate School, De Smet, Idaho, open from 1878 to 1974

Indiana 
 White's Manual Labor Institute, Wabash, Indiana. Open 1870–1895 and operated by Quakers
 Saint Joseph's College (Indiana) was founded in 1889 by Father Joseph A. Stephan as a secondary school to educate Native Americans.

Indian Territory 

 Arapaho Manual Labor and Boarding School, Darlington, Indian Territory, (Cheyenne and Arapaho Indian Reservation), opened in 1872 and paid for by federal funds, but run by the Hicksite (Liberal) Friends and Orthodox Quakers. Moved to Concho Indian Boarding School in 1909. * Cheyenne-Arapaho Boarding School, Darlington, Indian Territory, opened 1871 became the Arapaho Manual Labor and Boarding School in 1879
 Armstrong Academy, near Chahta Tamaha, Choctaw Nation, Indian Territory
 Cheyenne Manual Labor and Boarding School, Caddo Springs, Indian Territory, opened 1879 and paid with by federal funds, but run by the Hicksite (Liberal) Friends and Orthodox Quakers. Moved to Concho Indian Boarding School in 1909.
 Chuala Female Seminary (also known as the Pine Ridge Mission School), near Doaksville, Choctaw Nation, Indian Territory, open 1838–61 by the Presbyterian Church
 Darlington Mission School, Darlington, Indian Territory, Cheyenne and Arapaho Indian Reservation, run by the General Conference Mennonites from 1881 to 1902
 Fort Sill Indian School (originally known as Josiah Missionary School), near Fort Sill, Indian Territory, opened in 1871 by the Quakers. Operated until 1980.
 Pine Ridge Mission School, near Doaksville, Choctaw Nation, Indian Territory; see Chuala Female Seminary
 Quapaw Industrial Boarding School, Quapaw Agency, Indian Territory, open 1872–1900
 Spencer Academy (sometimes referred to as the National School of the Choctaw Nation), near Doaksville, Choctaw Nation, Indian Territory, operating 1842–1900
 Wealaka Mission School Wealaka, Indian Territory, open 1882–1907

Iowa 
 White's Manual Labor Institute, West Branch, Iowa, open 1881–87

Kansas 
 Haskell Indian Industrial Training School, Lawrence, Kansas, 1884–present

Kentucky 
  Choctaw Academy, Blue Spring, Scott County, Kentucky, opened 1825

Michigan  
 Mount Pleasant Indian Industrial Boarding School, Mount Pleasant, Michigan, 1893–1934

Minnesota 

 Morris Industrial School for Indians, Morris, Minnesota, open 1887–1909
 Pipestone Indian School, Pipestone, Minnesota
 Covenant of our Lady of the Lake
 Cross Lake
 St. Benedict's Industrial School
 Pine Point
 Red Lake
 Cass/Leech Lake
 Clontarf (St. Paul's Industrial School)
 St. Mary's Mission
 St. John's Industrial School
 St. Theodore's
 Vermillion Lake Indian School
 White Earth Boarding School
 Wild Rice River

Montana 

 Fort Shaw Indian School, Fort Shaw, Montana

Nebraska 
 Genoa Indian Industrial School, Genoa, Nebraska

Nevada 
 Stewart Indian School, Carson City, Nevada

New Mexico 

 Albuquerque Indian School, Albuquerque, New Mexico
 Nenannezed Boarding School, New Mexico
 Rehoboth Mission School located in Rehoboth, New Mexico, near the Navajo Nation. Operated as an Indian Boarding School by the Christian Reformed Church in North America from 1903 to 2007. The school currently operates as a day school only.History - Rehoboth Christian School
 San Juan Boarding School, New Mexico 
 Santa Fe Indian School, Santa Fe, New Mexico
 Shiprock Boarding School, Shiprock, New Mexico
 Southwestern Indian Polytechnic Institute, Albuquerque, New Mexico

New York 
 Thomas Indian School, near Irving, New York

North Dakota 

 Circle of Nations Indian School Home | Circle of Nations, Wahpeton, North Dakota
 Fort Totten Indian Industrial School, Fort Totten, North Dakota. Boarding and Indian Industrial School in 1891–1935.  Became a Community and Day School from 1940 to 1959.  Now a Historic Site run by the State Historic Society of North Dakota.
 Wahpeton Indian School, Wahpeton, North Dakota, 1904–93. In 1993 its name was changed to Circle of Nations School and came under tribal control. Currently open.

Oklahoma 

 Absentee Shawnee Boarding School, near Shawnee, Indian Territory, open 1893–1899
 Anadarko Boarding School, Anadarko, Oklahoma, open 1911–1933 
 Asbury Manual Labor School, near Eufaula, Creek Nation, Indian Territory, open 1850–1888 by the United Methodist Missions.
 Bacone College, Muscogee, Oklahoma, 1881–present
 Bloomfield Female Academy, originally near Achille, Chickasaw Nation, Indian Territory. Opened in 1848 but relocated to Ardmore, Oklahoma, around 1917 and in 1934 was renamed Carter Seminary.
 Bond's Mission School or Montana Industrial School for Indians, run by Unitarians, Crow Indian Reservation, near Custer Station, Montana, 1886–1897
 Burney Institute, near Lebanon, Chickasaw Nation, Indian Territory, open 1854–1887 when name changed to Chickasaw Orphan Home and Manual Labor School and operated by the Cumberland Presbyterian Church.
 Cameron Institute, Cameron, Choctaw Nation, Indian Territory, open 1893–early 20th century, was operated by the Presbyterian Church
 Cantonment Indian Boarding School, Canton, Indian Territory, run by the General Conference Mennonites from September, 1882 to 1 July 1927
 Carter Seminary, Ardmore, Oklahoma, 1917–2004 when the facility moved to Kingston, Oklahoma, and was renamed the Chickasaw Children's Village.
 Cherokee Female Seminary, Tahlequah, Cherokee Nation, Indian Territory, open 1851–1910
 Cherokee Male Seminary, Tahlequah, Cherokee Nation, Indian Territory, open 1851–1910
 Cherokee Orphan Asylum, Tahlequah, Cherokee Nation, Indian Territory, opened in 1871
 Chickasaw (male) Academy, near Tishomingo, Chickasaw Nation, Oklahoma. Opened in 1850 by the Methodist Episcopal Church and changed its name to Harley Institute around 1889.
 Chickasaw Children's Village, on Lake Texoma near Kingston, Oklahoma, opened 2004 
 Chickasaw National Academy, near Stonewall, Chickasaw Nation, Indian Territory. Open about 1865 to 1880
 Chickasaw Orphan Home and Manual Labor School (formerly Burney Academy) near Lebanon, Chickasaw Nation, Indian Territory, open 1887–1906
 Chilocco Indian Agricultural School, Chilocco, Oklahoma, open 1884–1980
 Colbert Institute, Perryville, Choctaw Nation, Indian Territory, open 1852–1857 by the Methodist Episcopal Church, South
 Collins Institute, near Stonewall, Chickasaw Nation, Indian Territory. Open about 1885 to 1905
 Concho Indian Boarding School, Concho, Oklahoma, open 1909–1983
 Creek Orphan Asylum, Okmulgee, Creek Nation, Indian Territory, opened 1895
 Dwight Mission, Marble City, Oklahoma
 Elliott Academy (formerly Oak Hill Industrial Academy), near Valliant, Oklahoma, 1912–1936
 El Meta Bond College, Minco, Chickasaw Nation, Indian Territory, open 1890–1919
 Emahaka Mission, Wewoka, Seminole Nation, Indian Territory, open 1894–1911
 Euchee Boarding School, Sapulpa, Creek Nation, Indian Territory, open 1894–1947
 Eufaula Dormitory, Eufaula, Oklahoma, name changed from Eufaula High School in 1952. Still in operation 
 Eufaula Indian High School, Eufaula, Creek Nation, Indian Territory, replaced the burned Asbury Manual Labor School. Open in 1892–1952, when the name changed to Eufaula Dormitory
 Folsom Training School, near Smithville, Oklahoma, open 1921–1932, when it became an all-white school
 Fort Coffee Academy, Fort Coffee, Choctaw Nation, Indian Territory. Open 1840–1863 and run by the Methodist Episcopal Church, South
 Goodland Academy & Indian Orphanage, Hugo, Oklahoma
 Harley Institute, near Tishomingo, Chickasaw Nation, Oklahoma. Prior to 1889 was known as the Chickasaw Academy and was operated by the Methodist Episcopal Church until 1906.
 Hillside Mission School, near Skiatook, Cherokee Nation, Indian Territory, open 1884–1908 by the Quakers
 Iowa Mission School, near Fallis, Iowa Reservation, Indian Territory, open 1890–1893 by the Quakers
 Jones Academy, Hartshorne, Choctaw Nation, Indian Territory/Oklahoma. Opened in 1891
 Koweta Mission School Coweta, Creek Nation, Indian Territory, open 1843–1861
 Levering Manual Labor School, Wetumka, Creek Nation, Indian Territory. Open 1882–91, operated by the Southern Baptist Convention.
 Mekasukey Academy, near Seminole, Seminole Nation, Indian Territory, open 1891–1930
 Murray State School of Agriculture, Tishomingo, Oklahoma, est. 1908
 New Hope Academy, Fort Coffee, Choctaw Nation, Indian Territory. Open 1844–1896 and run by the Methodist Episcopal Church, South
 Nuyaka School and Orphanage (Nuyaka Mission, Presbyterian), Okmulgee, Creek Nation, Indian Territory, 1884–1933
 Oak Hill Industrial Academy, near Valliant, Choctaw Nation, Indian Territory. Open 1878–1912 by the Presbyterian Mission Board. The Choctaw freedmen's academy was renamed as the Elliott Academy (aka Alice Lee Elliott Memorial Academy) in 1912.
 Oak Ridge Manual Labor School, near Holdenville, Indian Territory, in the Seminole Nation. Open 1848–1860s by the Presbyterian Mission Board.
 Oklahoma Presbyterian College for Girls, Durant, Oklahoma
 Oklahoma School for the Blind, Muskogee, Oklahoma
 Oklahoma School for the Deaf, Sulphur, Oklahoma
 Osage Boarding School, Pawhuska, Osage Nation, Indian Territory, open 1874–1922
 Park Hill Mission School, Park Hill, Indian Territory/Oklahoma, opened 1837 
 Pawnee Boarding School, Pawnee, Indian Territory, open 1878–1958 
 Rainy Mountain Boarding School, near Gotebo, Kiowa-Comanche-Apache Reservation, Indian Territory, open 1893–1920
 Red Moon School, near Hammon, Indian Territory, open 1897–1922
 Riverside Indian School, Anadarko, Oklahoma, open 1871–present
 Sac and Fox Boarding School, near Stroud, Indiant Territory, open 1872–1919 by the Quakers
 Sacred Heart College, near Asher, Potowatamie Nation, Indian Territory, open 1884–1902
 Sacred Heart Institute, near Asher, Potowatamie Nation, Indian Territory, open 1880–1929
 St. Agnes Academy, Ardmore, Oklahoma
 St. Agnes Mission, Antlers, Oklahoma
 St. Elizabeth's Boarding School, Purcell, Oklahoma
 St. John's Boarding School, Gray Horse, Osage Nation, Indian Territory, open 1888–1913  and operated by the Bureau of Catholic Indian Missions
 St. Joseph's Boarding School, Chickasha, Oklahoma
 St. Mary's Academy, near Asher, Potowatamie Nation, Indian Territory, open 1880–1946
 St. Louis Industrial School, Pawhuska, Osage Nation, Indian Territory, open 1887–1949 and operated by the Bureau of Catholic Indian Missions
 St. Mary's Boarding School, Quapaw Agency Indian Territory/Oklahoma, open 1893–1927
 St. Patrick's Mission and Boarding School, Anadarko, Indian Territory, open 1892–1909 by the Bureau of Catholic Indian Missions. It was rebuilt and called the Anadarko Boarding School. 
 Sasakwa Female Academy, Sasakwa, Seminole Nation, Indian Territory, open 1880–1892 and run by the Methodist Episcopal Church, South
 Seger Indian Training School, Colony, Indian Territory
 Seneca, Shawnee, and Wyandotte Industrial Boarding School, Wyandotte, Indian Territory
 Sequoyah High School, Tahlequah, Cherokee Nation, Indian Territory
 Shawnee Boarding School, near Shawnee, Indian Territory, open 1876–1918
 Shawnee Boarding School, Shawnee, Oklahoma, open 1923–1961
 Sulphur Springs Indian School, Pontotoc County, Chickasaw Nation, Indian Territory open 1896–98
 Tullahassee Mission School, Tullahassee, Creek Nation, Indian Territory, opened 1850 burned 1880
 Tullahassee Manual Labor School, Tullahassee, Creek Nation, Indian Territory, open 1883–1914 for Creek Freedmen
 Tushka Lusa Institute (later called Tuska Lusa or Tushkaloosa Academy), near Talihina, Choctaw Nation, Indian Territory opened 1892 for Choctaw Freedmen
 Tuskahoma Female Academy, Lyceum, Choctaw Nation, Indian Territory, open 1892–1925
 Wapanucka Academy (also sometimes called Allen Academy), near Bromide, Chickasaw Nation, Indian Territory. Open 1851–1911 by the Presbyterian Church.
 Wewoka Mission School, (also known as Ramsey Mission School) near Wewoka, Seminole Nation, Indian Territory. Open 1868–80 by the Presbyterian Mission Board.
 Wheelock Academy, Millerton, Oklahoma, closed 1955
 Wetumka Boarding School, Wetumka, Creek Nation, Indian Territory. Levering Manual Labor School transferred from the Baptists to the Muscogee (Creek) Nation in 1891 and they changed the name to the Wetumka Boarding School. Operated until 1910.
 Yellow Springs School, Pontotoc County, Chickasaw Nation, Indian Territory, open 1896–1905

Oregon 
 Chemawa Indian School, Salem, Oregon
Grand Ronde Agency School- Grand Ronde, Oregon
Indian Manual Labor Training School- Willamette, Oregon
Klamath Agency Schools (2)- Klamath Falls, Oregon
Siletz Agency School- Tillamook, Oregon
Umatilla Agency School
Warm Springs Agency Schools (2)- Warm Springs, Oregon

Pennsylvania 

 Carlisle Indian School, Carlisle, Pennsylvania, open 1879–1918

South Dakota 

 Chamberlain Indian School, Chamberlain, South Dakota opened from 1898 to 1908 when it closed, reopened later in 1927 as St. Josephs Indian School. 
 Flandreau Indian School, Flandreau, South Dakota opened in 1872 as a mission school and then as a boarding school in 1890. As of 2022, it is still in operation.
 Good Will Mission, Sisseton, South Dakota open 1872 to 1910.
 Immaculate Conception Indian School, Stephan, South Dakota opened in 1886 under the Bureau of Catholic Indian Missions, later renamed the Stephan Indian School. Came under control of the Crow Creek tribe in 1970 and is now the Crow Creek Tribal School
 Marty Indian School, Marty, South Dakota The school was founded in 1924 as St. Paul's Indian Mission School and has been tribally owned and operated by the Yankton Sioux Tribe since 1975.
 Oahe Industrial School, Pierre, South Dakota opened in 1874 by Congregationalists until construction of the Oahe Dam in the 1950s closed the school and flooded the land. 
 Pierre Indian School, Pierre, South Dakota opened in 1891 and still in operation today
 Pine Ridge Boarding School, Pine Ridge, South Dakota opened in 1888 as the Holy Rosary Mission by the Jesuits, renamed the Red Cloud Indian School in 1969
 St. Joseph's Indian School, Chamberlain, South Dakota, opened in 1927, run by the Priests of the Sacred Heart and still in operation
 St. Elizabeth's Indian School, Wakpala, South Dakotaopened 1886-1967
 Rapid City Indian School, Rapid City, South Dakota open from 1898 to 1933
 Springfield Indian School, Springfield, South Dakota opened as the Hope Indian Mission in 1879, renamed the St. Mary's Indian School for Girls in 1902, and closed by the 1970s.
 Sisseton Industrial School, Sisseton, South Dakota opened in 1873 as the Sisseton Manual Labor Boarding School, later named the Sisseton Industrial school in 1902, and closed by 1919
 Tekakwitha Indian Orphanage, Sisseton, South Dakota, opened by the Oblates of Mary Immaculate in 1938 and closed by the late 1960s.

Utah  
 Intermountain Indian School, Utah

Virginia 
 Hampton Institute, Hampton, Virginia, began accepting Native students in 1878.

Washington 
 Puyallup Indian School, Tacoma, Washington, open 1860–1920
 St. Mary's Mission Pascal Sherman Indian School, Omak, WA
 Tulalip Indian School, Tulalip, WA

Wisconsin 

 Hayward Indian School, Hayward, Wisconsin
 Oneida Indian School, Wisconsin
 Tomah Indian School, Wisconsin
 Wittenberg Indian School, Wittenberg, Wisconsin

See also 
 American Indian outing programs
 Canadian Indian residential school system
 Canton Indian Insane Asylum, an institution in South Dakota in which Native Americans were held against their will, one-third of whom died there
 Cultural assimilation of Native Americans
 Cultural genocide
 Fort Shaw Indian School Girls Basketball Team
 Indian Placement Program
 Indian Relocation Act of 1956
 Indian Reorganization Act of 1934
 Native Americans in the United States
 Native schools in New Zealand
 School segregation in the United States
 Stolen Generations, children of Australian Aboriginal descent who were removed from their families by the Australian and state government agencies
 Tobeluk v. Lind, a landmark case in Native education where 27 teenaged Alaskan Native plaintiffs brought suit against the State of Alaska claiming that their boarding school experiences were racial discrimination and educational inequity.

References

Further reading
 Adams, David Wallace. Education for Extinction: American Indians and the Boarding School Experience, 1875–1928. Lawrence, KS: University Press of Kansas, 1995.
 
 Child, Brenda J. (2000). Boarding School Seasons: American Indian Families, Lincoln: U of Nebraska Press. .
 
 Meriam, Lewis et al., The Problem of Indian Administration, Brookings Institution, 1928 (full text online at Alaskool.org)
 
 Warren, Kim Cary, The Quest for Citizenship: African American and Native American Education in Kansas, 1880–1935, Chapel Hill, NC: University of North Carolina Press, 2010.

External links
 Bear, Charla, "American Indian Boarding Schools Haunt Many", NPR, May 12, 2008
 An Indian Boarding School Photo Gallery, University of Illinois
 Carolyn J. Marr, "Assimilation Through Education: Indian Boarding Schools in the Pacific Northwest Essay", University of Washington Digital Collection
 Federal Indian Boarding School Initiative Investigative Report, US Department of Interior, May 2022
 Ibrahim, Emily Prey, Azeem. "The United States Must Reckon With Its Own Genocides". Foreign Policy. 

 
Assimilation of indigenous peoples of North America
History of education in the United States
United States federal Indian policy
C
Cultural genocide
Violence against children
Catholic Church sexual abuse scandals in the United States
Child sexual abuse in the United States
Christianity and children
Christianity-related controversies